Edwin Piper Cox (May 2, 1870 – March 11, 1938) was a Virginia politician.  He represented Richmond in the Virginia House of Delegates, and served as that body's Speaker from 1914 until 1916.

References

External links
 
 

Speakers of the Virginia House of Delegates
Democratic Party members of the Virginia House of Delegates
Politicians from Richmond, Virginia
1870 births
1938 deaths
People from Chesterfield County, Virginia
20th-century American politicians